The Louisa Gross Horwitz Prize for Biology or Biochemistry is an annual prize awarded by Columbia University to a researcher or group of researchers who have made an outstanding contribution in basic research in the fields of biology or biochemistry.

The prize was established at the bequest of S. Gross Horwitz and is named to honor his mother, Louisa Gross Horwitz, the daughter of trauma surgeon Samuel D. Gross. The prize was first awarded in 1967.

As of October 2018, 51 (50%) of the 101 prize recipients have subsequently been awarded the Nobel Prize in Physiology or Medicine (40) or Chemistry (11). It is regarded as one of the important precursors of a future Nobel Prize award.

Recipients
1967 Luis Leloir (1970 Chemistry)
1968 Har Gobind Khorana (1968 Physiology or Medicine), Marshall Warren Nirenberg (1968 Physiology or Medicine)
1969 Max Delbrück (1969 Physiology or Medicine), Salvador E. Luria (1969 Physiology or Medicine)
1970 Albert Claude (1974 Physiology or Medicine), George E. Palade (1974 Physiology or Medicine), Keith R. Porter
1971 Hugh E. Huxley
1972 Stephen W. Kuffler
1973 Renato Dulbecco (1975 Physiology or Medicine), Harry Eagle, Theodore T. Puck
1974 Boris Ephrussi
1975 K. Sune D. Bergstrom (1982 Physiology or Medicine), Bengt Samuelsson (1982 Physiology or Medicine)
1976 Seymour Benzer, Charles Yanofsky
1977 Michael Heidelberger, Elvin A. Kabat, Henry G. Kunkel
1978 David Hubel (1981 Physiology of Medicine), Vernon Mountcastle, Torsten Wiesel (1981 Physiology or Medicine)
1979 Walter Gilbert (1980 Chemistry), Frederick Sanger (1980 Chemistry)
1980 César Milstein (1984 Physiology or Medicine)
1981 Aaron Klug (1982 Chemistry)
1982 Barbara McClintock (1983 Physiology or Medicine), Susumu Tonegawa (1987 Physiology or Medicine)
1983 Stanley Cohen (1986 Physiology or Medicine), Viktor Hamburger, Rita Levi-Montalcini (1986 Physiology or Medicine)
1984 Michael S. Brown (1985 Physiology or Medicine), Joseph L. Goldstein (1985 Physiology or Medicine)
1985 Donald D. Brown, Mark Ptashne
1986 Erwin Neher (1991 Physiology or Medicine), Bert Sakmann (1991 Physiology or Medicine)
1987 Günter Blobel (1999 Physiology or Medicine) 
1988 Thomas R. Cech (1989 Chemistry), Philip A. Sharp (1993 Physiology or Medicine)
1989 Alfred G. Gilman (1994 Physiology or Medicine), Edwin G. Krebs (1994 Physiology or Medicine) 
1990 Stephen C. Harrison, Michael G. Rossmann, Don C. Wiley
1991 Richard R. Ernst (1991 Chemistry), Kurt Wüthrich (2001 Chemistry)
1992 Christiane Nüsslein-Volhard (1995 Physiology or Medicine), Edward B. Lewis (1995 Physiology or Medicine)
1993 Nicole Marthe Le Douarin, Donald Metcalf 
1994 Philippa Marrack, John W. Kappler
1995 Leland H. Hartwell (2001 Physiology or Medicine)
1996 Clay M. Armstrong, Bertil Hille
1997 Stanley B. Prusiner (1997 Physiology or Medicine)
1998 Arnold J. Levine, Bert Vogelstein
1999 Pierre Chambon, Robert Roeder, Robert Tjian
2000 H. Robert Horvitz (2002 Physiology or Medicine), Stanley J. Korsmeyer
2001 Avram Hershko (2004 Chemistry), Alexander Varshavsky
2002 James E. Rothman (2013 Physiology or Medicine), Randy W. Schekman (2013 Physiology or Medicine) 
2003 Roderick MacKinnon (2003 Chemistry)
2004 Tony Hunter, Tony Pawson
2005 Ada Yonath (2009 Chemistry)
2006 Roger D. Kornberg (2006 Chemistry)
2007 Joseph G. Gall, Elizabeth H. Blackburn (2009 Physiology or Medicine), Carol W. Greider (2009 Physiology or Medicine) 
2008 F. Ulrich Hartl, Arthur Horwich and Honorary Horwitz Prize to Rosalind Franklin
2009 Victor R. Ambros, Gary Ruvkun 
2010 Thomas J. Kelly, Bruce Stillman
2011 Jeffrey C. Hall (2017 Physiology or Medicine), Michael Rosbash (2017 Physiology or Medicine), Michael W. Young (2017 Physiology or Medicine)
2012 Richard Losick, Joe Lutkenhaus, Lucy Shapiro
2013 Edvard I. Moser (2014 Physiology or Medicine), May-Britt Moser (2014 Physiology or Medicine), John O’Keefe (2014 Physiology or Medicine)
2014 James P. Allison (2018 Physiology or Medicine)
2015 S. Lawrence Zipursky
2016 Howard Cedar, Aharon Razin, 
2017 Jeffrey I. Gordon
2018 Pierre Chambon, Ronald M. Evans, Bert O’Malley
2019 Lewis C. Cantley, David M. Sabatini, Peter K. Vogt
2020 Robert Fettiplace, James Hudspeth, Christine Petit 
2021 Katalin Karikó, Drew Weissman
2022 Karl Deisseroth, Peter Hegemann, Gero Miesenböck

See also

 List of biology awards
 List of biochemistry awards
 List of medicine awards

Notes

External links
 

Awards established in 1967
Biology awards
Medicine awards
Awards and prizes of Columbia University
1967 establishments in New York City
Biochemistry awards